Two merchant ships have been named SS D.M. Clemson.
 , U.S. propeller, steamer, bulk freighter, Official No. 157703.  Sank in 1908 on Lake Superior with the loss of all hands.
 , U.S. propeller, steamer, bulk freighter, Official No. 214599.  Scrapped in 1980, in Thunder Bay, Ontario.

References

Ship names